Chaudhry Tahir Bashir Cheema (born 11 May 1960) is a Pakistani politician who had been a member of the National Assembly of Pakistan, from June 2013 to May 2018.

Early life
He was born on 11 May 1960.

Political career

He ran for the seat of the Provincial Assembly of the Punjab as a candidate of Pakistan Democratic Alliance (PDA) from Constituency PP-231 (Bahawalnagar-VII) in 1990 Pakistani general election but was unsuccessful. He received 24,224 votes and lost the seat to Muhammad Akram, a candidate of Islami Jamhoori Ittehad (IJI).

He was elected to the Provincial Assembly of the Punjab  as a candidate of Pakistan Peoples Party (PPP) from Constituency PP-231 (Bahawalnagar-VII) in [[1993 Pakistani general election]]. He received 36,912 votes and defeated Muhammad Akram, a candidate of Pakistan Muslim League (N) (PML-N).

He ran for the seat of the Provincial Assembly of the Punjab as a candidate PPP from Constituency PP-231 (Bahawalnagar-VII) in 1997 Pakistani general election but was unsuccessful. He received 22,518 votes and lost the seat to Muhammad Akram, a candidate of PML-N.

He served as Chishtian Tehsil Nazim.

He ran for the seat of the National Assembly of Pakistan as a candidate of Pakistan Muslim League (Q) (PML-Q) from Constituency NA-190 (Bahawalnagar-III) in 2008 Pakistani general election but was unsuccessful. He received 70,081 votes and lost the seat to Abdul Ghafoor Chaudhry.

He was elected to the National Assembly  as a candidate of PML-N from Constituency NA-190 (Bahawalnagar-III) in 2013 Pakistani general election. He received 83,353 votes and defeated Ijaz-ul-Haq.

He quit PML-N in April 2018. In May 2018, he joined Pakistan Tehreek-e-Insaf (PTI).

References

Living people
Pakistan Muslim League (N) politicians
Punjabi people
Pakistani MNAs 2013–2018
1960 births
Punjab MPAs 1993–1996
Pakistan People's Party MPAs (Punjab)